The Bronze is a 2015 American sports comedy-drama film directed by Bryan Buckley and written by Melissa Rauch and Winston Rauch. It was produced by Mark Duplass and Jay Duplass through their Duplass Brothers Productions banner. The film stars Rauch, Gary Cole, Thomas Middleditch, Sebastian Stan, Cecily Strong, Haley Lu Richardson and Dale Raoul. It had its world premiere at the Sundance Film Festival on January 22, 2015, and was theatrically released on March 18, 2016, by Sony Pictures Classics.

Plot
Former gymnastics Bronze Medalist Hope Ann Greggory has been living off her celebrity status in her hometown of Amherst, Ohio, though she is reduced to going through her postal worker father's mail deliveries for spending money. When her former coach Pavleck suddenly commits suicide, a letter arrives addressed to Hope stating that if she can guide Pavleck's best student, a young gymnastics star named Maggie Townsend to the Olympics in Toronto, she will receive a $500,000 inheritance.

Unwilling to be overshadowed by Maggie's success, Hope instead plans to take the money by sabotaging Maggie's training so she can stay on top, initially feeding her junk food and a shake laced with marijuana. Maggie performs so poorly that arrogant Olympic Gold Medalist Lance Tucker, the team coordinator who resents Hope's celebrity on account of her inferior bronze medal (which she won despite a career-ending injury), threatens to take over as Maggie's coach. When Hope learns she will forfeit the inheritance money if she does not continue training Maggie, Hope grudgingly devotes herself to Maggie's training in earnest. Along the way, she enters a romance with her assistant coach Ben Lawfort, nicknamed "Twitchy" due to his involuntary facial spasm.

Hope's efforts eventually pay off when Maggie qualifies for the Olympic Games. However, she is shocked to discover that Pavleck's gym is in danger of closing because Pavleck had no money to her name when she died. Upon hearing the news, Hope's father confesses that he was the one who wrote the letter, hoping to motivate Hope to do something meaningful with her life. After a heated exchange, Hope gets drunk and ends up having sex with Lance, leading a heartbroken Ben, who witnessed the act, to break off their relationship.

Maggie wins the gold medal and is celebrated as a local hero in Amherst, but announces her intention to begin training with Lance in Los Angeles instead of staying with Hope. When Maggie fails to show up for an autograph signing at a mall, Hope addresses the disappointed crowd and declares that she will always be Amherst's hero. She comes up with a plan to finance Pavleck's gym on her own by selling uniforms and gymnastics lessons to local girls. She then apologizes to Ben and retains him as her assistant coach.

In the epilogue, a caption reveals that Maggie was forced to abandon her gymnastics career after becoming pregnant with Lance's child. Hope continues to coach gymnastics, though none of her pupils have gone on to any distinction in the sport.

Cast
 Melissa Rauch as Hope Ann Greggory
 Ellery Sprayberry as young Hope Ann 
 Haley Lu Richardson as Maggie Townsend
 Katherine Grable as the gymnastics stunt double for Maggie Townsend
 Gary Cole as Stan Greggory, Hope's father
 Cecily Strong as Janice Townsend, Maggie's mother
 Thomas Middleditch as Ben Lawfort, who works at the gym
 Sebastian Stan as Lance Tucker, Team USA coach
 Dale Raoul as Doris
 Michael Shamus Wiles as Davey
 Christine Abrahamsen as Coach Pavleck
 Kathryn Ding as Christa Carpenter, another gymnast
 Craig Kilborn as Heath, an announcer at the Olympics

Production
On July 9, 2014, it was reported Melissa Rauch, Gary Cole, Thomas Middleditch, Sebastian Stan, Cecily Strong and Haley Lu Richardson had all been cast in the film, as well as that Stephanie Langhoff would produce the film under the Duplass Brothers Productions banner.

Filming
Principal photography on the film began on July 4, 2014, in Amherst, Ohio. Production on the film concluded on July 26, 2014. In an interview after Sundance, Rauch stated that she and Buckley trimmed scenes and restored some original story ideas for a new theatrical version.

Release
In July 2014, Sony Pictures Worldwide Acquisitions acquired international distribution rights to the film. The film had its world premiere at the Sundance Film Festival on January 22, 2015. Shortly after, Relativity Media acquired distribution rights to the film. The film was originally scheduled for release in July 2015, and then October 2015. In September 2015, it was pulled from the schedule. The same month, Sony Pictures Classics acquired U.S distribution rights instead, and it was announced that Stage 6 Films would distribute the film internationally. The film was to be released in a limited release on March 11, 2016, but was delayed a week to March 18, 2016, in favor of a wide release.

Reception
On Rotten Tomatoes, the film has a rating of 36%, based on 99 reviews, with an average rating of 5.13/10. The site's consensus reads, "Enthusiastically unpleasant and mostly unfunny, The Bronze fails to stick the landing – or much else along the way." On Metacritic, the film has a score of 44 out of 100, based on reviews from 31 critics, indicating "mixed or average reviews".

Peter Debruge of Variety wrote: "Though no one would accuse The Bronze of not being funny, it somehow manages not to be funny often enough."
Richard Roeper of the Chicago Sun-Times called it "one of those comedies that could have been a brilliant short film on 'Funny or Die' or 'Saturday Night Live', but wears out its welcome as a feature-length film."

References

External links
 
 

2015 films
2010s sports comedy-drama films
American sports comedy-drama films
Films shot in Ohio
Films set in Ohio
Gymnastics films
Films about Olympic gymnastics
Films about the Summer Olympics
Duplass Brothers Productions films
Sony Pictures Classics films
Stage 6 Films films
2015 independent films
2015 directorial debut films
2010s English-language films
2010s American films